Thierry Moreau (born 17 January 1967) is a former French professional footballer who played as a midfielder between 1985 and 2003.

Born in Lisieux, he played his entire career in France, for four clubs: Le Havre AC, Stade Malherbe Caen, Toulouse FC and Amiens SC. Following his retirement from football, he became a manager for lower league football clubs like Avenir Fonsorbais and Caen Maladrerie OS. He is currently the manager of FC Flérien.

For his performances in the 1996–97 French Division 2 season, he was named Ligue 2 Player of the Year.

External links

People from Lisieux
Association football midfielders
Le Havre AC players
Stade Malherbe Caen players
Toulouse FC players
Amiens SC players
Ligue 1 players
Ligue 2 players
French footballers
French expatriate footballers
Expatriate footballers in France
1967 births
Living people
Sportspeople from Calvados (department)
Footballers from Normandy